Émile Henriot (3 March 1889 – 14 April 1961) was a French poet, novelist, essayist and literary critic.

Biography
A son of the caricaturist Henri Maigrot, known under the pen name Henriot, he fought in the First World War. He first wrote as a journalist for  Temps in the inter-war period. He became literary critic for Monde, the heir of Temps on the Liberation of France, and for them coined the term 'nouveau roman' in 1957.  He was elected a member of the Académie française in 1946 at the same time as Édouard Le Roy.

Works 

 Poèmes à Sylvie (1906)
 Eurydice (1907)
 Petite suite italienne (1909)
 Jardins à la Française (1911)
 L’Instant et le Souvenir (1912)
 Vignettes romantiques et turqueries (1912)
 À quoi rêvent les jeunes gens ? (1913)
 La Flamme et les Cendres (1914)
 Bellica (1915)
 Le carnet d’un dragon dans les tranchées (1918)
 Valentin (1918)
 Le diable à l’hôtel ou les plaisirs imaginaires (1919)
 Temps innocents (1921)
 Courrier littéraire I (1922)
 Aquarelles (1922)
 Aventures de Sylvain Dutourd (1923)
 Livres et portraits, 3 vol. (1923–1927)
 Aricie Brun ou les Vertus bourgeoises (1924), Grand Prix du roman de l'Académie française
 Stendhaliana (1924)
 Courrier littéraire II (1925)
 Les livres du second rayon (1925)
 Promenades pittoresques sur les bords de la Seine (1926)
 L’enfant perdu (1926)
 Éloge de la curiosité (1927)
 Journal de bord (1927)
 Esquisses et notes de lecture (1928)
 Alfred de Musset (1928)
 Promenades italiennes (1928)
 L’art de former une bibliothèque (1928)
 Romanesques et romantiques (1930)
 Les occasions perdues (1931)
 Épistoliers et mémorialistes (1931)
 La marchande de couronnes (1932)
 En Provence (1932)
 Courrier littéraire : XVIIe siècle (1933)
 Le pénitent de Psalmodi (1933)
 Vers l’oasis en Algérie (1935)
 Portraits de femmes, d’Héloïse à Marie Bashkirtseff (1935)
 Tout va finir (1936)
 Portraits de femmes, de Marie de France à Katherine Mansfield (1937)
 Le livre de mon père (1938)
 Recherche d’un château perdu (1941)
 Le pèlerinage espagnol (1942)
 Quatre nouvelles (1944)
 Poètes français, 2 vol. (1944–1946)
 Naissances (1945)
 Courrier littéraire : XIIIe siècle, 2 vol. (1945)
 Beautés du Brésil (1946)
 Courrier littéraire : XIXe siècle, autour de Chateaubriand (1948)
 La rose de Bratislava (1948)
 Courrier littéraire : XIXe siècle, Stendhal, Mérimée et leurs amis (1948)
 Les fils de la louve (1949)
 Tout va recommencer sans nous (1951)
 Courrier littéraire III (1953)
 Courrier littéraire : XIXe-XXe siècles, 2 vol. (1955–1956)
 Au bord du temps (1958)
 On n’est pas perdu sur la terre (1960)

External links 
Académie française
 Publications by and about Émile Henriot in the catalogue Helveticat of the Swiss National Library

1889 births
1961 deaths
Writers from Paris
20th-century French novelists
French literary critics
Grand Prix du roman de l'Académie française winners
French male essayists
French male poets
French male novelists
20th-century French poets
20th-century French essayists
20th-century French male writers